Pope Leo XII (born Annibale Francesco Clemente Melchiorre Girolamo Nicola della Genga (2 August 1760 – 10 February 1829), was head of the Catholic Church and ruler of the Papal States from 28 September 1823 to his death in February 1829.

Leo XII was in ill health from the time of his election to the papacy to his death less than 6 years later, though he was noted for enduring pain well. He was a deeply conservative ruler, who enforced many controversial laws, including one forbidding Jews to own property. Though he raised taxes, the Papal States remained financially poor.

Biography

Family
Della Genga was born in 1760 at the Castello della Genga in the territory of Fabriano to an old noble family from Genga, a small town in what is now the province of Ancona, then part of the Papal States. He was the sixth of ten children born to Count Ilario della Genga and Maria Luisa Periberti di Fabriano, and he was the uncle of Gabriele della Genga Sermattei, who in the 19th century was the only nephew of a pope to be elevated to cardinal.

Education and ordination
Della Genga studied theology at the Collegio Campana in Osimo from 1773 to 1778 and later at the Collegio Piceno in Rome until 1783 when he commenced studies at the Pontifical Academy of Ecclesiastical Nobles. He later received the subdiaconate in 1782 and then the diaconate and was ordained to the priesthood on 14 June 1783; he received the latter two from Cardinal Marcantonio Colonna.

Papal nuncio and episcopate
He served as nuncio to Switzerland. In 1790 the attractive and articulate della Genga attracted favourable attention by a tactful oration commemorative of the late Emperor Joseph II. In 1794 Pope Pius VI made him a canon of Saint Peter's Basilica, and in 1793 created him Titular Archbishop of Tyre. He was consecrated in Rome in 1794 after the appointment and was despatched to Lucerne as the Apostolic Nuncio. In 1794 he was transferred to the nunciature at Cologne, but owing to the war had to make his residence in Augsburg. At this time, he believed it would be his last post and organized the construction of tombs for his mother and for himself.

During the dozen or more years he spent in Germany he was entrusted with several honourable and difficult missions, which brought him into contact with the courts of Dresden, Vienna, Munich and Württemberg, as well as with Napoleon I of France. It is charged, however, that during this period his finances were disordered, and his private life was not above suspicion. He was suspected of having allegedly fathered three illegitimate children.

After the Napoleonic abolition of the States of the Church (1798), he lived for some years at Monticelli Abbey, solacing himself with music and with bird-shooting, pastimes which he continued even after his election as Pope.

Cardinal

In 1814 della Genga was chosen to carry Pope Pius VII's congratulations to Louis XVIII of France upon his restoration.

On 8 March 1816 he was created Cardinal-Priest of Santa Maria in Trastevere and he received his red zucchetto on 11 March and his titular church on 29 April 1816. Later he was appointed as the Archpriest of the Basilica di Santa Maria Maggiore, and appointed to the episcopal see of Sinigaglia, which he resigned in 1818 due to health reasons. He resigned without ever having entered his diocese.

On 9 May 1820, Pope Pius VII gave him the distinguished post of Vicar-General of His Holiness for the Diocese of Rome.

Pontificate

Papal election

Pope Pius VII died in 1823 after yet another long pontificate that spanned over two decades. In the conclave of 1823, della Genga was the candidate of the zelanti faction and in spite of the active opposition of France, he was elected as the new pope by the cardinals on 28 September 1823, taking the name of Leo XII.

His election had been facilitated because he was thought to be close to death, but he unexpectedly rallied. He had even remarked about his own health to the cardinals, saying that they would be electing "a dead man". It was said in the conclave that he lifted his robes to show the cardinals a pair of swollen and ulcerated legs to deter them, but that made them even more eager to elect him. Before the conclave opened, Naples indicated that it objected to five candidates in the election which included della Genga. While della Genga did not receive a single vote in the first and second ballots, he received seven in the third and then four in the fifth. While it seemed that Cardinal Antonio Gabriele Severoli would prevail on 21 September since he had just below the needed amount, Cardinal Giuseppe Albani interposed the veto on the behalf of the Austrian Empire against Severoli. While it was later indicated that the French court would not be amenable to the election of della Genga, Severoli's voting bloc decided to cast their votes for della Genga, seeing him receive 34 votes to become pope.

Leo XII was 63 at the time of his election and frequently fell victim to infirmities. He was tall and thin with an ascetic look and a melancholic countenance.  At this time Vincent Strambi served as bishop for the remainder of the pontificate of Pope Pius VII before his successor Pope Leo XII accepted Strambi's resignation and summoned him to Rome as his advisor. But the sudden illness of the pope - which seemed to prove fatal - prompted Strambi to offer his own life to God so that the pope could live. Leo XII rallied to great surprise but Strambi died of a stroke within the week.

So Leo XII fell ill after his coronation but after his recovery, he showed surprising endurance in carrying out his work. Leo XII devoted himself to his work and was simple in his mode of life. He had a passion for shooting birds and was rumored to have killed a peasant with whom he argued about sporting rights.

The cardinal protodeacon Fabrizio Ruffo crowned him as pontiff on 5 October 1823.

Foreign policy
Pius VII's Secretary of State, Ercole Consalvi, who had been Della Genga's rival in the conclave, was immediately dismissed, and Pius'  policies rejected. Leo XII's foreign policy, entrusted at first to the octogenarian Giulio Maria della Somaglia and then to the more able Tommaso Bernetti, negotiated certain concordats very advantageous to the papacy. Personally most frugal, Leo XII reduced taxes, made justice less costly, and was able to find money for certain public improvements, yet he left the Church's finances more confused than he had found them, and even the elaborate jubilee of 1825 did not really mend financial matters.

Domestic policy
Leo XII's domestic policy was one of extreme conservatism: "He was determined to change the condition of society, bringing it back to the utmost of his power to the old usages and ordinances, which he deemed to be admirable; and he pursued that object with never flagging zeal." He condemned the Bible societies, and under Jesuit influence reorganised the educational system, placing it entirely under priestly control through his bull Quod divina sapientia and requiring that all secondary instruction be carried out in Latin, as he required of all court proceedings, also now entirely in ecclesiastical hands. All charitable institutions in the Papal States were put under direct supervision.

Laws such as that forbidding Jews to own property and allowing them only the shortest possible time in which to sell what they owned, and that requiring all Roman residents to listen to Catholic catechism commentary, led many of Rome's Jews to emigrate, to Trieste, Lombardy and Tuscany.

"The results of his method of governing his states soon showed themselves in insurrections, conspiracies, assassinations and rebellion, especially in Umbria, the Marches and Romagna; the violent repression of which, by a system of espionage, secret denunciation, and wholesale application of the gibbet and the galleys, left behind it to those who were to come afterwards a very terrible, rankling and long-enduring debt of party hatreds, of political and social demoralisation, and— worst of all— a contempt for and enmity to the law, as such." In a regime that saw the division of the population into Carbonari and Sanfedisti, he hunted down the Carbonari and the Freemasons with their liberal sympathisers.

Leo XII made himself unpopular with the people due to the fact that he constrained them to endless rules that concerned private life and public affairs. He decreed that a dressmaker who sold low or transparent dresses would incur ipso facto excommunication. The pope also denied the Jews the right to possess material possessions and allowed them the shortest time to sell their belongings. He revived the regulations of the Middle Ages in regard to segregation and marks for identification.

Vaccination controversy

According to some contemporary authors such as G. S. Godkin, Leo XII was also said to have prohibited vaccination. More recent scholarship has been unable to find any ban or any suggestion of a ban by Leo XII and his administration. Donald J. Keefe in his paper "Tracking the footnote" traced a quote by Leo XII which strongly condemned vaccination to "an unverified citation" by Dr. Pierre Simon in Le Contredes Naissances. The response of the Papacy to the arrival of vaccination in Italy has been documented in Pratique de la vaccination antivariolique dans les provinces de l’État pontifical au 19ème siècle, an article written by Yves-Marie Bercé and Jean-Claude Otteni for Revue d’Histoire Ecclésiastique. According to Bercé and Otteni, the biographers and contemporaries of Leo XII do not mention any interdict. The authors credit the origin of the mythical vaccination ban of Leo XII to the personality of Cardinal Della Genga when he became pope in 1823. His intransigence and piety alienated liberal opinion very quickly. His austere spirituality made him the target of criticisms and mocking remarks. English travelers visiting the peninsula and many of the diplomats established in Rome remarked on the severity of the pontiff.

The absence of a prohibition is evidenced by the fact that in 1828 the Medical-Surgical Society of Bologna was able to implement a vaccination campaign.

Activities

Beatifications and canonizations
Leo XII beatified a number of individuals in his pontificate which totaled at 15. He beatified: Angelina di Marsciano and Bernardo Scammacca (8 March 1825), Hippolytus Galantini (29 June 1825), Angelus of Gualdo Tadino (3 August 1825) and Angelus of Acri (18 December 1825). He also beatified in 1825: Julian of Saint Augustine, Alphonsus Rodriguez and Jakob Griesinger. He beatified Imelda Lambertini (20 December 1826) and also confirmed the cultus of Jordan of Saxony in 1826. He also beatified Helen of Poland and Maddalena Panattieri on 26 September 1827 as well as Giovanna Soderini (1827) and Helen Duglioli and Juana de Aza (the mother of Saint Dominic) in 1828.

Leo XII also created Peter Damian a Doctor of the Church on 27 September 1828 in addition to the formal canonization he presided over.

Saint Vincenzo Strambi
He collaborated with Vincenzo Strambi (future saint)– who served as his advisor. When he was on the brink of death in 1825, Strambi offered himself to God for the survival of the pope. The pope rallied from his ailment, but Strambi died.

Religious congregations
The pope also approved the Missionary Oblates of Mary Immaculate on 17 February 1826 when he gave it official recognition.

Jubilee

Leo XII celebrated the jubilee in 1825 in an event that saw more than half a million pilgrims travel to Rome to participate in the solemnities. To mark the event, Leo XII issued the encyclical Quod hoc ineunte on 24 May 1825 that proclaimed the Jubilee.

Consistories

He held 8 consistories in which he elevated 25 new cardinals into the cardinalate. This included Cardinal Bartolomeo Alberto Cappellari – the future Pope Gregory XVI – on 13 March 1826. In addition, Leo XII nominated three cardinals whom he reserved "in pectore" but later revealed.

For the December 1824 allocations, Leo XII considered elevating Félicité Robert de Lamennais despite knowing about his crude character and extreme social and moral positions. Nevertheless, the nomination never occurred, however, other sources allege that he declined the pope's invitation. For the October 1826 allocation, Leo XII had nominated one cardinal in pectore whom he later revealed in 1828, however, several subsequent sources indicate that the renowned English historian John Lingard was also created a cardinal in pectore and simply never announced. In the 1828 consistory, the Bishop of Osimo e Cingoli Timoteo Maria Ascensi was to be made a cardinal but died nine days before the consistory occurred.

Death and legacy

On 5 February 1829, after a private audience with the new Cardinal Secretary of State, Tommaso Bernetti, he was suddenly taken ill and he seemed to know that his end was near. On 8 February, he asked for and received the Viaticum and was anointed. On 9 February, he lapsed into unconsciousness and on the next morning, he died.  The minister to Rome for French King Charles X, François-René de Chateaubriand, who was near to the events, wrote: "The pope died of that haemorrhoidal condition to which he was subject. The blood, being carried to the bladder, occasioned a retention which they tried to relieve by means of an incision. It is thought His Holiness was injured by the operation. However it may be, after four days of suffering, Leo XII died this morning at nine as I was arriving at the Vatican, where an agent of the Embassy had spent the night." He was buried in a monument of him in Saint Peter's Basilica on 15 February 1829. His remains were transferred and buried before the altar of Pope Leo I on 5 December 1830.

Leo XII is considered to have been a man of noble character, with a passion for order and efficiency, but one who lacked insight into the temporal developments of his time. His rule was unpopular in Rome and in the Papal States, and by various measures of his reign he diminished greatly for his successors their chances of solving the new problems that confronted them.

Rumors of a liaison
It was alleged that Leo XII had a liaison as a prelate with the wife of a Swiss Guard (known as Pfiffer). The allegation was brought to the attention of Pope Pius VI, who met with the prelate to discern the truth of the matter. He refuted all claims to the pope and the matter was dropped then and there save for the fact that Della Genga affirmed he was close to Pfiffer.

As a nuncio in Germany, it was rumored he allegedly fathered three illegitimate children.

Bibliography  
Leo XII issued at least 6 encyclicals during his reign.

See also 
 Cardinals created by Leo XII
 List of popes

References

Further reading 

 Leo XII at The Papal Library
 Artaud de Montor: Histoire du Pape Léon XII. 2 vols., 1841
 Schmidlin I, pp. 367–474
 M. Rossi: Il conclave di Leone XII. Lo Stato Pontificio e l’Italia all'indomani del Congresso di Vienna. 1935
 EC VII, 1156–1158
 LThK2. Vol. VI, Sp. 952–953
 Georg Schwaiger: Leo XII. In: LThK3 6 (1997), 827–828.
 Kelly: Reclams Lexikon der Päpste. 1988, pp. 322f.
 
 
 
 Catholic-Hierarchy entry

|-

 
Italian popes
19th-century popes
People from the Province of Ancona
1760 births
1829 deaths
19th-century Italian people
18th-century Italian people
Pontifical Ecclesiastical Academy alumni
Burials at St. Peter's Basilica
Cardinal Vicars
Apostolic Nuncios to Cologne
Popes
Cardinals created by Pope Pius VII